Major General Alfred Cyril Curtis CB DSO MC (2 November 1894 – 13 October 1971) was a senior British Indian Army officer who commanded the 14th Indian Infantry Division during the Second World War.

Biography
Born on 2 November 1894 and educated at Bedford School, Curtis entered the Royal Military College, Sandhurst and was commissioned as a second lieutenant into the 11th Sikh Regiment of the British Indian Army in 1915, serving in France, Belgium and Mesopotamia during the First World War, and ending the war as a Captain. Between the wars he attended the Staff College, Camberley from 1927 to 1928 and, during the Second World War he served in Burma. He commanded the 14th Indian Infantry Division and was appointed as Aide-de-camp to King George VI in 1944.

Major General Alfred Curtis retired in 1948 and died in Jersey on 13 October 1971.

References

1894 births
1971 deaths
Indian Army generals of World War II
Companions of the Order of the Bath
Companions of the Distinguished Service Order
People educated at Bedford School
Graduates of the Staff College, Camberley
Graduates of the Royal Military College, Sandhurst
British Indian Army officers
Recipients of the Military Cross